Marcos Daniel Pineda García (born 5 June 1977) is a Colombian politician. He has been mayor of Montería twice: in the period 2008-2011, becoming the youngest mayor in the history of the city, and again in the period 2016-2019. He is a Business Administrator from the Sergio Arboleda University, a specialist in Communication and Political Management from the Complutense University of Madrid and a Master in Political Action and Citizen Participation in the Rule of Law from the Francisco de Vitoria University in Madrid. He was elected Senator of the Republic for the period 2022-2026.

References

1977 births
People from Montería
Living people
George Washington University alumni
Mayors of places in Colombia